Peeter Võsa (born 28 December 1967 in Tallinn) is an Estonian journalist, television presenter and politician. He has been member of XII Riigikogu.

He is a member of Estonian Centre Party.

References

Living people
1967 births
Estonian journalists
Estonian television presenters
Estonian Centre Party politicians
Members of the Riigikogu, 2011–2015
Tallinn University of Technology alumni
People from Tallinn
Politicians from Tallinn
20th-century Estonian people